Sankranti is a 2005 Indian Telugu-language drama film produced by R. B. Choudary under Super Good Films and directed by Muppalaneni Shiva. The film features an ensemble cast consisting of Venkatesh, Srikanth, Sneha, Aarthi Agarwal, Sangeetha, Rathi, Siva Balaji, Sharwanand, Sharada and Chandra Mohan. The music was composed by S. A. Rajkumar with cinematography by B. Balamurugan and editing by Nandamuri Hari. The film released on 18 February 2005 and was successful at the box office. It is a remake of the 2001 Tamil film Aanandham.

Plot
Raghavendra owns a provisional store and is the eldest among four brothers, and all live together in a home along with their parents Rama Chandraiah and Janakamma. Raghavendra is widely respected by everyone in the family and was responsible for bringing back their family to a good state after financial troubles a few years back where he also loses his love Padma, who got engaged to him but got cancelled by Padma's parents who reject Raghavendra on the basis of poverty. Now, Raghavendra marries Anjali, who is a lot more responsible and kind to everyone. Vishnu is the second son in the family who assists Raghavendra in managing their provisional store. He is innocent and marries his relative Kalyani who is Padma's younger sister, but she is short-tempered and picks up quarrels often. Chinna is the third son in the family, and he goes to college where he falls for his classmate Kaveri, who is the only daughter of a rich arrogant man named Govardhan Chowdary. Vamsi is the youngest son and studies in college.

Kalyani feels that only Raghavendra is respected by everyone and not Vishnu because Raghavendra manages the provisional store, while Vishnu just assists him. She keeps insisting Vishnu to start a separate provisional store, which he does not accept as that would separate him from his brothers. Meanwhile, Govardhan gets to know about Kaveri's love towards Chinna and warns him to forget her. Chinna gets a job and leaves to Delhi as he does not want to marry Kaveri against her father's wishes.

One day, Kalyani begins a quarrel at home, saying that Raghavendra has a separate savings account in the bank and takes money from the account without the knowledge of other family members. Raghavendra feels bad upon hearing this. Suddenly, Kalyani and Vishnu's daughter faints and is rushed to the hospital. It is revealed that the child was suffering from a serious disease which only Raghavendra knew before, and he was saving money to meet out the medical expenses without informing others, as they will worry if they get to know about the child's disease. Kalyani realizes her mistake upon knowing this and apologizes to Raghavendra for her harsh behavior towards him and Anjali.

Later, they start a rice mill. Raghavendra gets to know about Chinna's love towards Kaveri and goes to meet Govardhan with a marriage proposal. Govardhan agrees for the wedding but on a condition that Chinna should stay along with Kaveri in his home as he does not want to send his daughter to another home after wedding. Raghavendra agrees to the condition but does not inform this to Chinna as he will not agree. On the day of engagement, Chinna gets to know about the condition, cancels the wedding, and comes back to his home to meet his family members. Following him, Kaveri also comes, asking him to marry her against her father's wishes.

Raghavendra convinces the couple that if they get married without Govardhan's permission, then it will be a big blow to Govardhan's status in society, and they should not be the reason behind that. He also convinces Kaveri to leave to her home immediately before anyone could know about this. When they step out of the home, they see Govardhan with a group of men to attack Raghavendra's family. However, he has overheard Raghavendra's conversation with Kaveri, realizes his good nature, and agrees for their wedding. Finally, Chinna and Kaveri get married happily, and Kaveri lives along with everyone in a joint family in Raghavendra's home.

Cast

 Venkatesh as Raghavendra
 Srikanth as Vishnu
 Sneha as Anjali
 Aarthi Agarwal as Padma
 Sangeetha as Kalyani
 Siva Balaji as Chinna
 Rathi as Kaveri
 Sharwanand as Vamsi
 Sharada as Janakamma, mother of Raghavendra, Vishnu, Chinna and Vamsi
 Chandra Mohan as Rama Chandraiah, father of Raghavendra, Vishnu, Chinna and Vamsi
 Prakash Raj as Govardhan Chowdary, Kaveri's father
 Sudhakar as Anji
 Tanikella Bharani as Rayudu
 AVS as Supermarket Owner
 Venu Madhav as Nalla Balu
 Suman Setty as Thief
 Tirupathi Prakash as Thief
 Narsing Yadav as Police Officer
 Raghunatha Reddy as Sheshagiri
 Rallapalli as Satya Murthy
 Duvvasi Mohan
 Malladi Raghava as Kavitha's father
 Siva Parvathi as Padma and Kalyani's mother
 Sri Harsha as Balaji
 Chandra Mouli as Postman
 Jahnavi as Kavitha
 Dil Ramesh
 Baby Srilekha as Shanthi, Vishnu and Kalyani's daughter
 Master Tanish as Young Chinna
 Master Manoj as Young Vamsi

Soundtrack

The music was composed by S. A. Rajkumar and released by the ADITYA Music Company. The soundtrack of Sankranti was released at a function arranged in the Rama Naidu studios on the night of 20 January 2005. Sarath Kumar, K Raghavendra Rao and D Rama Naidu were invited as guests. The actors who attended included Venkatesh, Aarthi Agarwal, Aditi Agarwal, Sharada, Sneha, Sudhakar, Srikanth, Siva Balaji, and Sharwanand. Sarath Kumar and K. Raghavendra Rao released the soundtrack and gave the first copy to D. Ramanaidu. Anupama hosted this event. Aditya Music bought the audio rights to this film. The soundtrack was released on 21 January 2005.

Reception
Jeevi of idlebrain.com gave a review of rating 3.75/5 stating, "First half of the film is good and it establishes and defines each and every character. Second half is more effective because the director could really bring heavy emotions out and end the film smoothly. I recommend this film to everybody. Everybody should watch this film along with their family members to realize what they really miss in real life. This film also reminds us how to behave with our family members and how to share love/affection."

Phani of Totltollywood.com gave a review stating, "The film has got all plus points except for the average music and only little comedy. This is definitely a long runner at the box office since this is a family entertainer and the director did a great job in the presentation. Cast also delivered good performances. This is definitely a good emotional family entertainer."

Movies.fullhyderabad.com's review said, "The film actually manages to claw back to watchability, it is due to excellent performances by Venkatesh and Srikanth, and some heart-tugging conceptualization and dialogues in the second half. Ventakesh in particular essays a role that makes you completely accept him as the perfect man to learn from, how to handle complex situations in family relationships."

Allindiansite.com said, "'Sankranti' is based on the concept of joint family. The story runs on the relations between the characters. It is a decent family entertainer with good dose of sentiments."

The IndiaGlitz review said, "Family values are the strength of India. And it is also the strength of Indian films. Sankranti is as good an example as you can get. The film is all about the bondage between four brothers despite the pulls and pressures from various quarters including from their wives. Sankranti is, in a sense, a tribute to the family tradition. Venkatesh shoulders all the burden of the family and his role manfully. Though the role has shades of his own Suryhavamsham, Venkatesh proves that he is the man for such mushy roles. But the man who walks with all the plaudits is Srikanth. It is a tailor-made character for him. He just revels in it, underplaying it with finesse. Siva Balaji and Sarvanand have also performed adequately. All told, you feel all at home, in more ways than one."
The film was a huge blockbuster in 2005 and grossed around 30.7 crores domestically. It's total collection is 41.9 crore Worldwide. This was the second highest grossing Telugu Film of 2005,following Chiranjeevi's Andarivaadu, which grossed 43cr worldwide.

References

External links
 

2000s Telugu-language films
2005 films
Telugu remakes of Tamil films
Indian drama films
Films about families
Films directed by Muppalaneni Shiva